The 2008 HiQ MSA British Touring Car Championship season was the 51st British Touring Car Championship (BTCC) season. It was also the first that the championship was sponsored by HiQ. Fabrizio Giovanardi won his second consecutive title.

Changes for 2008

Teams and drivers
After capturing the Drivers and Manufacturers titles in their first season with the Vectra, the Triple 8-run works Vauxhall squad expanded to three cars for 2008. Reigning champion Fabrizio Giovanardi remained on board, being joined by Matt Neal, returning to Vauxhall for the first time since 2002 after leaving his family-run Team Dynamics squad, with whom he won back-to-back titles in 2005 and 2006. The third car was piloted by Tom Onslow-Cole, who impressed at the wheel of a WSR BMW in his debut BTCC campaign in 2007.

SEAT were once again the only other full-works operation, and fitted their Leons with the rapid yet often unreliable turbo diesel engines being used by the marque's World Touring Car Championship operation. Jason Plato, who came extremely close to securing a second BTCC title the previous year, remained on board, as did GT convert Darren Turner.

Tom Chilton, moving the opposite direction after two years with Vauxhall, replaced the outgoing Neal at Team Dynamics (again running as Team Halfords), with Gordon Shedden remaining on board in the other of their self-developed Honda Civics. As with the previous year, in spite of not being a factory-backed operation, the cars were not eligible for Independents points due to their dominance of the category with the Integra in 2005 and 2006.

West Surrey Racing (again running as Team RAC) campaigned the BMW 320is for a second year, with reigning Independents champion Colin Turkington again heading the team and single-seater convert Stephen Jelley replacing the Vauxhall-bound Onslow-Cole. Mat Jackson returned in his 320is after a successful debut season in 2007, with his small family-run operation now enjoying BMW Dealer Team UK backing.

Motorbase Performance also joined the BMW brigade after ditching their SEAT Toledos, with former Independents champion Rob Collard returned to the series full-time with the team after spending most of 2007 away. He was partnered by Steven Kane, who had been a front-runner for the team in the Porsche Carrera Cup Great Britain after making the switch from single-seaters. Also leaving the Toledo behind for 2008 were GR Asia (again running under the Team Air Cool banner), who switched to a newer Leon (which ran with its original petrol engine unlike the works cars) for the returning Adam Jones.

Team Eurotech continued with the ex-Team Dynamics Honda Integra for a third year, expanding to two cars with team boss Mike Jordan now joined by his 18-year-old son Andrew, who had impressed in rallycross before making his road racing debut in the Renault Clio Cup in 2007. John George also campaigned his Integra for a second year with TH Motorsport.

Alan Taylor returned for a full season in his Integra with Robertshaw Racing, having debuted in the closing meetings of 2007. The team also added a pair of ex-WTCC Chevrolet Lacettis to their line-up driven by Matt Allison, switching from Motorbase, and SEAT Cupra Championship graduate Harry Vaulkhard. Allison left the team due to budgetary reasons after the first three meetings and was not replaced.

Among the other returnees were Kartworld Racing (entered as Team KWR), who continued to run the venerable MG ZS, cutting back to a single example for team boss Jason Hughes. Tech-Speed Motorsport, again running under the Arkas Racing banner, expanded to two cars for its second year with the Vauxhall Astra Sport Hatch, Turkey's Erkut Kizilirmak being joined by Martin Bell, who had piloted a Geoff Steel Racing BMW in the previous two years.

BTC Racing began the year running their temperamental Lexus IS200s from the previous two seasons, before switching to a pair of SEAT Toledos acquired from Motorbase from the second round onwards. Team stalwart Chris Stockton remained alongside multiple truck racing champion Stuart Oliver, who was making his first steps into cars. Gareth Howell, who appeared in a Toledo for Motorbase in 2007, was recruited to replace Oliver at meetings that clashed with his truck racing commitments, making two such appearances before Oliver left the championship and the second car was dropped.

The only all-new entry to the championship came in the shape of young Scotsman Michael Doyle, who had been a race winner in the Clio Cup the previous year. He ran a BTCC-spec Honda Civic Type-R, originally built and run by the works Arena operation between 2002 and 2005, with his family-run In-Tune Racing team.

Other changes
 Dunlop was no longer the title sponsor of the BTCC, being replaced by HiQ. However, both brands shared the same parent company.

Entry list
On 12 March 2008 the BTCC Organisers released the official MSA HiQ British Touring Car Championship entry list for the 2008 season.

 Team Halfords were neither a works or an independent entry.

Calendar
All races were held in the United Kingdom. The 2008 season once again had ten race weekends with three BTCC rounds at each. A provisional calendar had been announced by series organisers.

Championship standings

No driver may collect more than one "Lead a Lap" point per race no matter how many laps they lead.
Race 1 polesitter receives 1 point.

Drivers Championship

Note: bold signifies pole position (1 point given in first race only, and race 2 and 3 poles are based on race results), italics signifies fastest lap (1 point given all races) and * signifies at least one lap in the lead (1 point given all races).

Manufacturers Championship

Teams Championship 

* – BTC Racing lose all points for three changes of engine.
** – Team Eurotech lose 10 points for three changes of engine.
*** – Team Air Cool and Team Halfords lose 20 points for four changes of engine.

Independents Trophy

Independent Teams Trophy 

* – BTC Racing & Team Eurotech lose 10 points for three changes of engine.
** – Team Air Cool lose 20 points for four changes of engine.

References

External links

Touring Car Championship
British Touring Car Championship seasons